"Five-star" is the first greatest hits album by J-pop singer Yuki, released on October 3, 2007 in Japan. This album commemorates the fifth anniversary of her solo debut. The album was released in two formats, a CD only version and a CD+DVD version, which is in a black-and-silver or white-and-gold leather slipcase.

Track listing

Release history

2007 greatest hits albums
2007 video albums
Epic Records compilation albums
Epic Records video albums